Kappiyarai is a panchayat town in Kanniyakumari district in the Indian state of Tamil Nadu.

Demographics
 India census, Kappiyarai had a population of 13,475. Males constitute 50% of the population and females 50%. Kappiyarai has an average literacy rate of 82%, higher than the national average of 59.5%: male literacy is 84%, and female literacy is 80%. In Kappiyarai, 9% of the population is under 6 years of age.

Religious
Churches present in Kappiyarai are St.Catherine Church, The Salvation Army Church, Full Gospel Pentecostal Church, CSI Church and JCC Church

References

Cities and towns in Kanyakumari district